The 1910 Boston Doves season was the 40th season of the franchise. The Doves finished eighth in the National League with a record of 53 wins and 100 losses.

Regular season

Season standings

Record vs. opponents

Notable transactions 
 May 13, 1910: Lew Richie was traded by the Doves to the Chicago Cubs for Doc Miller.

Roster

Player stats

Batting

Starters by position 
Note: Pos = Position; G = Games played; AB = At bats; H = Hits; Avg. = Batting average; HR = Home runs; RBI = Runs batted in

Other batters 
Note: G = Games played; AB = At bats; H = Hits; Avg. = Batting average; HR = Home runs; RBI = Runs batted in

Pitching

Starting pitchers 
Note: G = Games pitched; IP = Innings pitched; W = Wins; L = Losses; ERA = Earned run average; SO = Strikeouts

Other pitchers 
Note: G = Games pitched; IP = Innings pitched; W = Wins; L = Losses; ERA = Earned run average; SO = Strikeouts

Relief pitchers 
Note: G = Games pitched; W = Wins; L = Losses; SV = Saves; ERA = Earned run average; SO = Strikeouts

Notes

References 
1910 Boston Doves season at Baseball Reference

Boston Doves seasons
Boston Doves
Boston Doves
1910s in Boston